The Constitution (Twenty-ninth Amendment) Act, 2017 was a proposed amendment to the Constitution of Pakistan seeking to allow the federal cabinet to authorize a minister or state minister to advise the President of Pakistan instead of the Prime Minister.

It was never adopted and never officially became part of the constitution.

References

Amendments to the Constitution of Pakistan
2017 in Pakistani law
Acts of the Parliament of Pakistan